Rose-May Poirier (born March 2, 1954) is a Canadian politician from New Brunswick. She has been a member of the Senate of Canada since February 28, 2010. Previously, she served as member of the Legislative Assembly of New Brunswick for Rogersville-Kouchibouguac from 1999 to 2010 and municipal councillor in Saint-Louis-de-Kent from 1993 to 1999. 

A Progressive Conservative, she was first elected to the Legislative Assembly of New Brunswick in the 1999 provincial election defeating Liberal candidate Maurice Richard by just over 100 votes – the closest result of the election.  She faced Richard again in the 2003 election and defeated him by 321 votes.

Poirier joined the New Brunswick cabinet following the 2003 election as minister responsible for the Office of Human Resources and retained that post until a cabinet shuffle in early 2006 when she became Minister of Local Government and Minister responsible for Aboriginal Affairs.

She was re-elected in 2006 in which her party's government was defeated and went into opposition.

On January 29, 2010, she was appointed to fill a vacant New Brunswick seat in the Canadian Senate by Prime Minister Stephen Harper.  Her appointment became effective February 28, 2010. Unlike the other four senators named on January 29, Poirier's appointment was delayed a month so that the government of New Brunswick would not have to call a by-election to replace her just months before the 2010 provincial election.

References

1954 births
Living people
Members of the Executive Council of New Brunswick
Progressive Conservative Party of New Brunswick MLAs
Women MLAs in New Brunswick
People from Northumberland County, New Brunswick
Women members of the Senate of Canada
Conservative Party of Canada senators
Canadian senators from New Brunswick
21st-century Canadian politicians
21st-century Canadian women politicians
Women government ministers of Canada
New Brunswick municipal councillors